TAC, or tac, may refer to:

People
 Pablo Tac, US scholar
 Pham Cong Tac, a leader of the Cao Dai religion

Places
 Tác, a village in Fejér County, Hungary

Organisations
 TAC (building automation), a Swedish building automation company
 Tactical Air Command, a former command of the US Air Force
 Technical Advisory Council, a committee advising the US FCC
 Technical Assistance Center, a company's internal support group for external customers
 The Aleut Corporation, Alaska, United States, a Native Regional Corporation
 The Analysis Corporation, a private intelligence firm
 The Ant Commandos, a company which produces video game console peripherals
 The Asatru Community, an inclusive Norse Pagan/Heathen sect; see Kindred (Heathenism)
 The Athletics Congress, US sports governing body, became USATF in 1992
 The Architects Collaborative, Cambridge, Massachusetts, US
 Thomas Aquinas College, a college with multiple campuses in the US
 Treatment Action Campaign, a South African AIDS organisation
 Treaty of Amity and Cooperation in Southeast Asia
 Traditional Anglican Communion
 Transatlantic Council, Boy Scouts of America

Transport
 TAC Colombia, a charter airline based in Bogotá, Colombia
 TAC, the IATA code for Daniel Z. Romualdez Airport on Leyte island, Philippines
 TAC, the National Rail code for Tackley railway station in the county of Oxfordshire, UK
 TAC - Transportes Aéreos Catarinense, a former Brazilian airline
 Tecnologia Automotiva Catarinense (TAC) a Brazilian automotive company
 Terminal area chart, an aeronautical chart of the area surrounding a major airport
 Thai Airways Company, a former Thai airline
 Trans Air Congo, a Congolese airline
 Transport Accident Commission, an insurer in Victoria, Australia

Military and law enforcement
 Demro TAC-1, a pistol calibre carbine/submachine gun
 McMillan TAC-50, an American sniper rifle
 Tactical Air Command, a former major command of the United States Air Force
 TAC 30, the official name of a SWAT unit belonging to the King County Sheriff's Office

Science and technology
 TAC, a codon for the amino acid Tyrosine
 TAC, a mixture of tetracaine, adrenaline and cocaine, a liquid sometimes given as a soothing gel to children
 TaC, chemical formula for Tantalum carbide
 tac, a Linux command that concatenates lines in reverse, named by analogy with cat
 TAC (software), an instant messaging and chat client program
 TAC-2, game controller compatible with Atari 2600 video game systems
 Terminal Access Controller, a host computer that accepts terminal connections
 Thermally Advantaged Chassis, an Intel computer specification
 Three-address code, a representation of intermediate code used by compilers
 Time-activity curve, tracer concentration within a region of interest within dynamic image plotted over time
 Triacetyl cellulose, a polymer used in display applications
 Trigeminal autonomic cephalgia, a type of headache that occurs on one side of the head
 Type Allocation Code, part of a mobile device's IMEI identifying maker and model

Media
 Group TAC, a Japanese anime and computer graphics studio
 The Accessible Channel, a Canadian digital television channel
 The American Conservative, a paleoconservative magazine published by the American Ideas Institute

Other
 tac, the ISO 639-3 code for the Tarahumara language spoken in the state of Chihuahua, Mexico
 Terrible-Monster Attacking Crew, a fictional pilot squadron in Ultraman Ace

 The Arts Centre or TAC, former name of Home of the Arts, Gold Coast
 Total allowable catch, in commercial fishing under the European Union's Common Fisheries Policy

See also